Edinburgh North is a northern suburb of Adelaide. It is in the City of Playford local government area, the state electoral seat of Taylor and the federal electoral seat of Spence.

The suburb of Edinburgh North was gazetted on 27 October 2011. It renamed Elizabeth West plus a small area of Penfield. The suburb is entirely industrial except for the St Patrick's Technical College. None of the suburb is zoned residential.

References

Suburbs of Adelaide